WMEE (97.3 FM) is a radio station broadcasting a hot adult contemporary format. The station serves the Fort Wayne, Indiana area. The station is currently owned by Federated Media.

History
The WMEE calls originated in 1971 at 1380 kHz on the AM dial as a Top 40 outlet before switching to 97.3 FM in 1979. 97.3 FM had previously programmed beautiful music as WMEF (and originally as WKJG-FM). The station has legendary and iconic nicknames and monikers throughout the years includes "The New Magic 97 FM, WMEE" (the first nickname and moniker used when WMEE moved from AM to FM in 1979), "The All New, All Hit 97 FM, WMEE", "Power 97 FM, WMEE", "Mix 97 FM, WMEE", and currently "97.3 WMEE".

HD Radio
WMEE is licensed to broadcast in the HD Radio (hybrid) format:
97.3 HD1 is a digital simulcast of the traditional WMEE (analog) signal.
97.3 HD2 is a simulcast of News Talk WOWO.

Notable WMEE-FM alumni
 John Davies
 Brooklynne Beatty
 "Dan" Scheie
 "Boomer"
 "David" Scheie
 Jimmy Knight
 Charly Butcher (deceased)
 Anthony "Tony" Richards
 Zack Skyler
 Gregg "Chuck Brodie" Cassidy
 J.C. Baker
 Jennifer Carr
 Gary "Adam Cook" Wheeler
 Chuck "Shotgun Lenny Harrison" Martin
 Captain Chris 
 Steven "Magic Steve" Christian
 Jeffrey "Jeff" Davis
 Robert Elliott (deceased)
 Chad Hunt
 Scott Howard
 Antonette "Toni" Kayumi
 Dean McNeil
 Craig Morrison & Samantha Adams
 Brady Garrison 
 Harry Lyles
 Kevin Meek
 Trina Neeley
 Richard Nunez
 Paul Poteet
 Douglas "Doug B." Pritchett
 Diane Shannon
 Bert Sherwood
 J.D. Spangler
 Scott Tsuleff
 Chris Tyler
 Christopher "Chris Coyote" Underwood
 Casey "Shaggy" Kasem
 Shadoe Stevens

Notable WMEE AM alumni
 Patrick "Big Pat" Barry
 Don Chevillet
 Dan Collins
 Bill Donovan
 Rick Hughes
 Chris Kane
 Casey "Shaggy" Kasem
 Shotgun Lenny Harrison (Chuck Martin)
 Bob Lee
 Victor Locke-Now in Durango, CO, Owner of victorlocke.com
 Gary Lockwood
 Jack Martin
 Jack Maurer-Now Associate Broker, Real Living Ness Bros. Real Estate & Auction Co.
 Mark Rivers
 James "Fast Jimi" Roberts
 Tom Roberts
 Steve Shine
 Michael St. John
 Doug Steele
 Vince Turner
 Mike Waite
 Tom Williams

References

External links
federatedmedia.com/radio/
Official site
Aircheck of the end of WMEF's beautiful music format and the beginning of Magic 97, 1979

MEE
Hot adult contemporary radio stations in the United States